The cinnabar boobook (Ninox ios), also known as the cinnabar hawk-owl, is a hawk-owl endemic to the island of Sulawesi, Indonesia. It was described as a new species to science by American ornithologist Pamela C. Rasmussen in 1999 based on a single specimen collected by Frank Rozendaal from Bogani Nani Wartabone National Park on Minahassa Peninsula, northern Sulawesi, in 1985. Subsequently, it has also been observed in Lore Lindu National Park in central Sulawesi, greatly expanding the known habitat range.

It has a relatively long tail and narrow pointed wings. Otherwise, very little is known of its habits. Based on morphological similarities with owlet-nightjars, Rasmussen suggests the cinnabar boobook may be an insectivore and prey on invertebrates in flight.

References

External links
BirdLife Species Factsheet.

Ninox
Endemic birds of Sulawesi
Birds described in 1999